Hengyang Metro, officially Hengyang Rail Transit, is a planned monorail rapid transit system in Hengyang, Hunan, China. Once completed, the system is scheduled to comprise six lines and have a total length of 158 km.

History
A rapid transit system in Hengyang has been planned since 2017. In September 2017, a contract was signed between the municipal council of Hengyang and BYD, whose Hunan headquarters are located within the city, for a straddle beam monorail system to be constructed in Hengyang.

Lines

References 

Hengyang
Rapid transit in China
Rail transport in Hunan